Greatest Hits – Chapter One  (stylized as Greatest Hits • Chapter One) is the first greatest hits album by American singer Kelly Clarkson, released on November 16, 2012, by RCA Records. It contains material from Clarkson's first five studio albums: Thankful (2003), Breakaway (2004), My December (2007), All I Ever Wanted (2009), and Stronger (2011). Its three newly recorded songs, "Catch My Breath", "Don't Rush", and "People Like Us", served as singles; contributions to their production came from Sound Kollectiv, Greg Kurstin, and Dann Huff.

Background and release

Clarkson was first approached on releasing a greatest hits album after releasing My December in December 2007, but found the idea appalling. She insisted: "Doing a greatest hits would be crazy. I am not 50. Artists who do one after three albums think their career is coming to an end." On September 11, 2012, the UK branch of Sony Music Entertainment revealed on a press conference that a greatest hits album from Clarkson would be released by the end of 2012. In an interview with The Insider promoting the release of her promotional single "Get Up (A Cowboys Anthem)" (2012), Clarkson hinted that she would release a new set of songs by the end of the year. On October 4, 2012, Clarkson announced that a new single from the compilation album, "Catch My Breath", would be released the following week. RCA Records later announced that the album's title would be Greatest Hits – Chapter One; the album was released on November 19, 2012, in the United States and was preceded by the release of "Catch My Breath" on October 16, 2012.

Content and artwork
Greatest Hits – Chapter One contains seventeen tracks spanning ten years of music material from Clarkson's career, including a collaborative work with country artist Jason Aldean and three newly recorded tracks specifically made for the greatest hits album. "A Moment Like This", representing the oldest material on the compilation, is taken from her non-album single "Before Your Love"/"A Moment Like This" in 2002. "Miss Independent" is the only song from her debut album, Thankful (2003). "Breakaway" first appeared on the soundtrack of the Disney film The Princess Diaries 2 (2004). "Breakaway" also appeared on her 2004 album Breakaway, along with "Since U Been Gone", "Behind These Hazel Eyes", "Because of You", and "Walk Away". "Never Again" is the only song from her 2007 album My December. Tracks from her 2009 album All I Ever Wanted are "My Life Would Suck Without You" "I Do Not Hook Up" and "Already Gone". "Mr. Know It All" and "Stronger (What Doesn't Kill You)" both originally appeared on her 2011 album Stronger. "Don't You Wanna Stay" first appeared on Aldean's 2010 album, My Kinda Party, and was also included in Stronger. The remaining track, a cover of "I'll Be Home for Christmas", originally appeared on her second extended play, iTunes Session (2011).

The compilation features three previously unreleased tracks: "Catch My Breath", "Don't Rush" and "People Like Us". "Catch My Breath", an electropop song, was written by Clarkson along with her musical director Jason Halbert and Eric Olson. It was released as the first single from the compilation album. "Don't Rush" features the country artist Vince Gill. The international version of the compilation includes the songs "The Trouble with Love Is", "Beautiful Disaster", "I Do Not Hook Up" and "Dark Side". "The Trouble with Love Is" first appeared on the soundtrack of the Universal film Love Actually (2003), and also appeared on Thankful. The live version of "Beautiful Disaster" (originally from Thankful) also appeared as the final track from Breakaway. "I Do Not Hook Up" appeared on All I Ever Wanted and "Dark Side" appeared on Stronger. The deluxe edition DVD contains almost all of Clarkson's music videos including the accompanying music videos of "Low" and "Don't Waste Your Time" (which weren't included on the compilation). The photographic artwork for the album was shot by Canadian-American photographer Jill Greenberg, who was known for producing portrait covers of Time, Wired, Fast Company, and Entertainment Weekly. It also marked the first time Greenberg designed a phonographic cover despite photographing Clarkson back in 2002.

Promotion

Live performances
Clarkson performed "Don't Rush" at the 46th Annual Country Music Association Awards with Vince Gill on November 1, 2012. On November 18, 2012, she performed a medley of "Miss Independent", "Since U Been Gone", "Stronger (What Doesn't Kill You)" and "Catch My Breath" at the 40th Annual American Music Awards. On November 20, 2012, she performed "Catch My Breath" on The Ellen DeGeneres Show.

Singles

The compilation's lead single, "Catch My Breath", premiered on On Air with Ryan Seacrest on October 10, 2012, and was released to retail on October 15, 2012. It debuted on the Billboard Hot 100 at number 54 and peaked at number 19, becoming Clarkson's 15th top-40 hit on the chart. It also peaked at number 14 on the Billboard Pop Songs chart and at number 5 on the Billboard Adult Pop Songs chart. The second single, "Don't Rush", featuring Vince Gill, was released on October 30, 2012, exclusively for country music radio and retail, fifteen days after the release of "Catch My Breath". It entered the Billboard Hot 100 at number 97, eventually peaking at number 87, and at the Billboard Hot Country Songs chart at number 23. In January 2013, "People Like Us" was confirmed as the third single from the album. It was released to radio stations in the United States on April 8, 2013.

Critical reception

AllMusic's senior editor Stephen Thomas Erlewine lauded Clarkson's transcendence from her American Idol image and her endurance throughout the 2000s, writing that "Consequently, Greatest Hits – Chapter One winds up sounding like pop sounded in the new millennium: alternatively calculated and inspired, a pop star who always seemed in control of her fate even when she aspired to be heard as bumper music in malls from sea to shining sea." Robert Copsey of Digital Spy opined that "the sailing has been pretty smooth for Kelly ever since, turning out big pop songs (courtesy of Dr. Luke and Max Martin) with even bigger vocals that are, for the most part, wholly reassuring." Philip Matusavage of musicOMH wrote a positive review, remarking: "Chapter One is a testament to Clarkson’s durability and she is one of the few artists to use such an ‘I’m still relevant, dammit!’ suffix whom you can envisage releasing a Chapter Two." Jonathan Keefe of Slant Magazine noted: "Clarkson's five studio albums have been a mixed bag, both in terms of quality and overall style, ranging from the R&B-lite of Thankful to the slick pop-rock of Breakaway and All I Ever Wanted. Clarkson has yet to settle on a distinct POV as an artist, but the smart sequencing of Chapter One downplays this limitation."

Commercial performance
Greatest Hits – Chapter One debuted at number eleven on the Billboard 200 Albums Chart, selling about 75,000 copies in its first week. It has sold over 728,000 copies as of September 2017. It also debuted on the Swiss Albums Chart at number 92 on the week ending December 2, 2012. On the Japanese Oricon Albums Chart, the compilation debuted at number 80 on December 3, 2012.

Track listing

Notes
 signifies a vocal producer
 signifies a co-producer
 signifies an additional producer

Charts

Weekly charts

Year-end charts

Certifications

Release history

References

2012 greatest hits albums
Albums produced by Dann Huff
Albums produced by David Kahne
Albums produced by Dr. Luke
Albums produced by Greg Kurstin
Albums produced by John Shanks
Albums produced by Max Martin
Albums produced by Raine Maida
Albums produced by Ryan Tedder
Kelly Clarkson compilation albums
Music video compilation albums
RCA Records compilation albums
RCA Records video albums
19 Recordings compilation albums